CKNR-FM is a Canadian radio station, which broadcasts an adult contemporary format at 94.1 MHz in Elliot Lake, Ontario. The station uses the on-air brand 94.1 Moose FM.

History
The station first aired in 1967 at 1340 AM, and was owned by Algonquin Broadcasting. CKNR had two sister stations, CKNS in Espanola (established in 1976) and CJNR in Blind River (actually the oldest of the three, first established in 1958). Huron Broadcasting acquired the stations in 1976.

In 1986, CJNR and CKNS were given approval to amend their broadcasting licenses, by deleting the condition of license which required these stations to operate as affiliates of the CBC's English-language AM radio network.

All three stations became part of Mid-Canada Radio in 1986, and were subsequently sold to the Pelmorex Radio Network in 1990.

On November 15, 1990, CKNR was given permission to disaffiliate from the CBC as the Elliot Lake area was now served by the Corporation's CBEC-FM.

North Channel Broadcasting acquired the stations from Pelmorex in 1996, and converted CKNR to 94.1 MHz on March 3, 1997 with a transmitter on Manitoulin Island. Due to the station's signal strength (it can be heard as far as Sudbury and into Michigan's eastern Upper Peninsula), the CJNR and CKNS signals were both discontinued. After the move to 94.1 FM, the station transmitted in mono and aired a mix of classic hits, oldies, and adult contemporary with some current music. Prior to and after CKNR's move to FM, the station had aired the Toronto Blue Jays baseball games.

North Channel subsequently sold CKNR to Haliburton Broadcasting Group in 2004, a sale which reunited CKNR with many of its former sister stations in the Pelmorex Radio Network.

After Haliburton purchased CKNR-FM, the station rebranded as 94.1 Moose FM with adult contemporary, variety music and switched to FM stereo.

On April 23, 2012, Vista Broadcast Group, which owns a number of radio stations in western Canada, announced a deal to acquire Haliburton Broadcasting, in cooperation with Westerkirk Capital. The transaction was approved by the CRTC on October 19, 2012.

Transmitters
Although officially licensed to Elliot Lake, the primary transmitter is located closer to Little Current (approximately 80 km to the southeast of the city), and parts of the city of Elliot Lake itself consequently do not receive an adequate signal on the 94.1 frequency. On July 9, 2007, CKNR applied to re-broadcast their FM signal at 98.7 MHz to serve the population of Elliot Lake and received CRTC approval on August 24, 2007.

Previous logos

References

External links
94.1 Moose FM

Knr
Knr
Knr
Elliot Lake
Radio stations established in 1967
1967 establishments in Ontario